East Asia Forum (EAF) is an English-language international policy forum directed by Peter Drysdale and based at the Australian National University's Crawford School of Public Policy. It was launched in 2006 by then Australian Treasurer Peter Costello.

It is a platform for dialogue on Asian economic and public policy, publishing two articles a day online. EAF also releases a quarterly magazine, the East Asia Forum Quarterly (EAFQ), published by ANU Press.

EAF offers peer-reviewed daily analysis of economics, politics and public policy in the Asia Pacific. Articles focus on policy issues including trade, economic and social policy, governance, international relations and political developments. Content includes Australian, East Asian and Asia Pacific regional perspectives, with specialist contributors from around the region. An editorial is issued every Monday.

East Asia Forum is an initiative by the East Asian Bureau of Economic Research (EABER). Its articles are archived and catalogued by the National Library of Australia.

Contributors

East Asia Forum has nearly 4000 listed contributors, many of whom submit opinion pieces on a regular basis. Contributors to the online and print publications include:

East Asia Forum Quarterly issues

Reinventing global trade Vol. 13, No. 2 April–June 2021
Asia after Biden's election Vol. 13, No. 1 January–March 2021
How China is changing Vol. 12, No. 4 October–December 2020
Japan's choices Vol. 12, No. 3 July–September 2020
Immunising Asia Vol. 12, No. 2 April–June 2020
Middle power game Vol. 12, No. 1 January–March 2020
Economics and security Vol. 11, No. 4 October–December 2019
Japan's leadership moment Vol. 11, No. 3 July–September 2019
Chinese realities Vol. 11, No. 2 April–June 2019
Investing in women Vol. 11, No. 1 January–March 2019
Asian crisis, ready or not Vol. 10, No. 4 October–December 2018
Peak Japan Vol. 10, No. 3 July–September 2018
Trade wars Vol. 10, No. 2 April–June 2018
Why ASEAN Matters Vol. 10, No. 1 January–March 2018
China's influence Vol. 9, No. 4 October–December 2017
Japan repositions Vol. 9, No. 3 July–September 2017
Strategic diplomacy in Asia Vol. 9, No. 2 April–June 2017
Towards Asian integration Vol. 9, No. 1 January–March 2017
Managing China Vol. 8, No. 4 October–December 2016
Reinventing Japan Vol. 8, No. 3 July–September 2016
Gender and sexuality Vol. 8, No. 2 April–June 2016
Stuck in the middle? Vol. 8, No. 1 January–March 2016
Asia's intergenerational challenges Vol. 7, No. 4 October–December 2015
Japan–China relations Vol. 7, No. 3 July–September 2015
Leadership in the region Vol. 7, No. 2 April–June 2015
Asia's minorities Vol. 7, No. 1 January–March 2015
The state and economic enterprise Vol. 6, No. 4 October–December 2014
A Japan that can say 'yes' Vol. 6, No. 3 July–September 2014
The G20 summit at five Vol. 6, No. 2 April–June 2014
On the edge in Asia Vol. 6, No. 1 January–March 2014
Indonesia's choices Vol. 5, No. 4 October–December 2013
Leading China where? Vol. 5, No. 3 July–September 2013
Coming to Terms with Asia Vol. 5, No. 2 April–June 2013
Demographic Transition Vol. 5, No. 1 January–March 2013
Energy Resources and Food Vol. 4, No. 4 October–December 2012
Japan: Leading from Behind Vol. 4, No. 3 July–September 2012
China's Investment Abroad Vol. 4, No. 2 April–June 2012
Ideas for India Vol. 4, No. 1 January–March 2012
Where is Thailand Headed Vol. 3, No. 4 October–December 2011
Asia's Global Impact Vol. 3, No. 3 July–September 2011
Governing China Vol. 3, No. 2 April–June 2011
Regulatory Reawakening Vol. 3, No. 1 January–March 2011
Asia and the G20 Vol. 2, No. 4 October–December 2010
Next Generation on Asia Vol. 2, No. 3 July–September 2010
Questions for Southeast Asia Vol. 2, No. 2 April–June 2010
The Challenge of China Vol. 2, No. 1 January–March 2010
Copenhagen and Beyond Vol. 1, No. 3 October–December 2009
Asia Pacific Community Vol. 1, No. 2 July–September 2009
Managing the Crisis Vol. 1, No. 1 April–June 2009

References

External links
East Asia Forum
East Asian Bureau of Economic Research

Politics of East Asia
East Asian studies journals